Anamera similis is a species of beetle in the family Cerambycidae. It was described by Stephan von Breuning in 1938. It is known from Myanmar and Laos.

References

Lamiini
Beetles described in 1938